Godziszewo may refer to the following places:
Godziszewo, Greater Poland Voivodeship (west-central Poland)
Godziszewo, Pomeranian Voivodeship (north Poland)
Godziszewo, West Pomeranian Voivodeship (north-west Poland)